The Empire Hotel in Bath, Somerset, England was built in 1901 and has been designated as a Grade II listed building. It is situated on Orange Grove close to both Bath Abbey and Pulteney Bridge.

It was designed by the Bath City Architect Major Charles Edward Davis for the hotelier Alfred Holland and built from Bath Stone, on the site of the Athenaeum. It was described by Sir Nikolaus Pevsner as a ‘monstrosity and an unbelievable piece of pompous architecture’.

The building occupies a large L-shaped block. It is six storeys high plus the octagonal corner tower. The front of the building onto Orange Grove has eight bays and the side overlooking the River Avon has nine bays.

The architecture of the roof shows the three classes of people, a castle on the corner for upper class, a house for the middle classes and a cottage for the lower classes.

During World War II it was used by the Admiralty as a postal sorting office and remained in their possession until the 1990s. In 1996 it was then refurbished and became apartments and a restaurant.

References

Hotel buildings completed in 1901
Grade II listed buildings in Bath, Somerset
Buildings and structures in Bath, Somerset
Hotels in Somerset
Grade II listed hotels